Abdellatif Osmane (born on 20 November 1968) is an Algerian football manager and former international player who played as a centre-back.

External links
 

1968 births
Living people
People from Mostaganem
Association football central defenders
Algerian footballers
Algeria international footballers
ES Mostaganem players
MC Oran players
WA Mostaganem players
Ligue 1 players
1998 African Cup of Nations players
21st-century Algerian people